Nikolaos Loizidis (born 13 October 1979) is a Greek wrestler. He competed in the men's freestyle 69 kg at the 2000 Summer Olympics.

References

External links
 

1979 births
Living people
Greek male sport wrestlers
Olympic wrestlers of Greece
Wrestlers at the 2000 Summer Olympics
Sportspeople from Athens
20th-century Greek people